Beauty and the Barge is a 1937 British comedy film directed by Henry Edwards and starring Gordon Harker, Judy Gunn and Jack Hawkins.  It was produced by Julius Hagen's production company Twickenham Film Studios, but made at the Riverside Studios in Hammersmith rather than at Twickenham. It was based on the 1905 play Beauty and the Barge by W. W. Jacobs.

Cast
 Gordon Harker as Captain Barley
 Judy Gunn as Ethel Smedley
 Jack Hawkins as Lieutenant Seton Boyne
 George Carney as Tom Codd
 Margaret Rutherford as Mrs Baldwin
 Ronald Shiner as Augustus
 Michael Shepley as Hebert Manners
 Margaret Yarde as Mrs Porton
 Sebastian Smith as Major Smedley
 Margaret Scudamore as Mrs Smedley
 Ann Wemyss as Lucy Dallas

References

Bibliography
 Wood, Linda. British Films, 1927-1939. British Film Institute, 1986.

External links
 
 
 

1937 films
1937 comedy films
British black-and-white films
Films based on works by W. W. Jacobs
Films directed by Henry Edwards
British comedy films
Films shot at Riverside Studios
Films set in England
Seafaring films
British films based on plays
1930s English-language films
1930s British films